María Carmen Portela (Buenos Aires, October 6, 1898 - 1983) was an Argentine engraver and sculptor who settled in Montevideo, Uruguay, in 1944, and became a legal citizen.

Biography

In 1939, Portela received a scholarship to study sculpture and engraving in Europe from the National Commission of Culture, which she was unable to use because of World War II. In 1944, she settled in Uruguay, where she obtained legal citizenship. She was married to the Uruguayan pedagogue and writer . In engraving, she specialized in the drypoint technique, while in sculpture, her portraits stood out. She was a teacher of plastic artists; Carmen Garayalde was a student.

Portela'a sculptural works can be found in public squares in Argentina and Uruguay, as well as in the National and Provincial Museum of Fine Arts (Buenos Aires), National and Municipal Museum of Fine Arts (Montevideo), as well as Argentinean provincial museums in Cordoba, Catamarca, Mendoza, and La Plata among others. Her works can also be found in the National Museum of the Czech Republic in Prague, the National Museum of Art of Romania in Bucharest, and the National Art Museum of China in Beijing, among other places.

References

1898 births
1983 deaths
Artists from Buenos Aires
20th-century Argentine sculptors
20th-century Uruguayan sculptors
20th-century engravers
Uruguayan women sculptors
Argentine women sculptors
Argentine emigrants to Uruguay
Women engravers